Pseudatemelia aeneella is a moth of the family Oecophoridae. It was described by Rebel in 1910. It is found in Croatia and Bosnia and Herzegovina.

The wingspan is 10-11.5 mm.

References

Moths described in 1910
Amphisbatinae
Moths of Europe